Donald MacLeod (26 January 1938 – 4 January 2015) was a Canadian cross-country skier who competed in the 1964 Winter Olympics.

References

1938 births
2015 deaths
Canadian male cross-country skiers
Olympic cross-country skiers of Canada
Cross-country skiers at the 1964 Winter Olympics